Whaling is the hunting of whales for their usable products such as meat and blubber, which can be turned into a type of oil that became increasingly important in the Industrial Revolution.
It was practiced as an organized industry as early as 875 AD. By the 16th century, it had risen to be the principal industry in the Basque coastal regions of Spain and France. The whaling industry then spread throughout the world and became increasingly profitable in terms of trade and resources. Some regions of the world's oceans, along the animals' migration routes, had a particularly dense whale population, and became the targets for large concentrations of whaling ships, and the industry continued to grow well into the 20th century. The depletion of some whale species to near extinction led to the banning of whaling in many countries by 1969, and to an international cessation of whaling as an industry in the late 1980s.

The earliest known forms of whaling date to at least 3000 BC. Coastal communities around the world have long histories of subsistence use of cetaceans, by dolphin drive hunting and by harvesting drift whales. Widespread commercial whaling emerged with organized fleets of whaleships in the 17th century; competitive national whaling industries in the 18th and 19th centuries; and the introduction of factory ships and explosive harpoons along with the concept of whale harvesting in the first half of the 20th century. By the late 1930s, more than 50,000 whales were killed annually. In 1986, the International Whaling Commission (IWC) banned commercial whaling because of the extreme depletion of most of the whale stocks.

Contemporary whaling for whale meat is subject to intense debate. Canada, Iceland, Japan, Norway, Russia, South Korea, the United States and the Danish dependencies of the Faroe Islands and Greenland continue to hunt in the 21st century. Countries that support commercial whaling, notably Iceland, Japan, and Norway, wish to lift the IWC moratorium on certain whale stocks for hunting. Anti-whaling countries and environmental activists oppose lifting the ban. Under the terms of the IWC moratorium, aboriginal whaling is allowed to continue on a subsistence basis. Over the past few decades, whale watching has become a significant industry in many parts of the world; in some countries, it has replaced whaling, but in a few others, the two business models exist in an uneasy tension. The live capture of cetaceans for display in aquaria (e.g., captive killer whales) continues.

History 

Whaling began in prehistoric times in coastal waters. The earliest depictions of whaling are the Neolithic Bangudae Petroglyphs in Korea, which may date back to 6000 BC. These images are the earliest evidence for whaling. Although prehistoric hunting and gathering is generally considered to have had little ecological impact, early whaling in the Arctic may have altered freshwater ecology.

Early whaling affected the development of widely disparate cultures on different continents. The Basques were the first to catch whales commercially, and dominated the trade for five centuries, spreading to the far corners of the North Atlantic and even reaching the South Atlantic. The development of modern whaling techniques was spurred in the 19th century by the increase in demand for whale oil, sometimes known as "train oil", and in the 20th century by a demand for margarine and later whale meat.

Many countries once had significant whaling industries, and these are covered in separate articles; for example Whaling in the Netherlands, Whaling in Scotland, and Whaling in Argentina. Canada, Iceland, Japan, Norway, Russia, South Korea, the United States and the Danish dependencies of the Faroe Islands and Greenland continue to hunt in the 21st century, and are described below.

Modernity 

The primary species hunted are minke whales,
belugas, narwhals,
and pilot whales, which are some of the smallest species of whales. There are also smaller numbers killed of gray whales, sei whales, fin whales, bowhead whales, Bryde's whales, sperm whales and humpback whales.

Recent scientific surveys estimate a population of 103,000 minkes in the northeast Atlantic. With respect to the populations of Antarctic minke whales, as of January 2010, the IWC states that it is "unable to provide reliable estimates at the present time" and that a "major review is underway by the Scientific Committee."

Whale is used little today and modern whaling is primarily done for food: for pets, fur farms, sled dogs and humans, and for making carvings of tusks, teeth and vertebrae. Both meat and blubber (muktuk) are eaten from narwhals, belugas and bowheads. From commercially hunted minkes, meat is eaten by humans or animals, and blubber is rendered down mostly to cheap industrial products such as animal feed or, in Iceland, as a fuel supplement for whaling ships.

International cooperation on whaling regulation began in 1931 and culminated in the signing of the International Convention for the Regulation of Whaling (ICRW) in 1946. Its aim is to:

provide for the proper conservation of whale stocks and thus make possible the orderly development of the whaling industry.

International Whaling Commission 

The International Whaling Commission (IWC) was set up under the ICRW to decide hunting quotas and other relevant matters based on the findings of its Scientific Committee. Non-member countries are not bound by its regulations and conduct their own management programs. It regulates hunting of 13 species of great whales, and has not reached consensus on whether it may regulate smaller species.

The IWC voted on July 23, 1982, to establish a moratorium on commercial whaling of great whales beginning in the 1985–86 season. Since 1992, the IWC's Scientific Committee has requested that it be allowed to give quota proposals for some whale stocks, but this has so far been refused by the Plenary Committee.

At the 2010 meeting of the International Whaling Commission in Morocco, representatives of the 88 member states discussed whether or not to lift the 24-year ban on commercial whaling. Japan, Norway and Iceland have urged the organisation to lift the ban. A coalition of anti-whaling nations has offered a compromise plan that would allow these countries to continue whaling, but with smaller catches and under close supervision. Their plan would also completely ban whaling in the Southern Ocean. More than 200 scientists and experts have opposed the compromise proposal for lifting the ban, and have also opposed allowing whaling in the Southern Ocean, which was declared a whale sanctuary in 1994. Opponents of the compromise plan want to see an end to all commercial whaling, but are willing to allow subsistence-level catches by indigenous peoples.

Whaling catches by location 
These totals include great whales: counts from IWC and WDC
and IWC Summary Catch Database version 6.1, July 2016.

The IWC database is supplemented by Faroese catches of pilot whales,
Greenland's and Canada's catches of narwhals (data 1954–2014), belugas from multiple sources shown in the Beluga whale article, Indonesia's catches of sperm whales, and bycatch in Korea.

Most of the whale species in the table are not considered endangered by the IUCN ("least concern" or "data deficient"). Only the sei whale is classified as "endangered", and the fin whale is classified as "vulnerable" by the IUCN.

Ongoing debate 

Key elements of the debate over whaling include sustainability, ownership, national sovereignty, cetacean intelligence, suffering during hunting, health risks, the value of 'lethal sampling' to establish catch quotas, the value of controlling whales' impact on fish stocks and the rapidly approaching extinction of a few whale species.

Sustainability 

The World Wide Fund for Nature says that 90% of all northern right whales killed by human activities are from ship collisions, calling for restrictions on the movement of shipping in certain areas. Noise pollution threatens the existence of cetaceans. Large ships and boats make a tremendous amount of noise that falls into the same frequency range of many whales. By-catch also kills more animals than hunting. Some scientists believe pollution to be a factor. Moreover, since the IWC moratorium, there have been several instances of illegal whale hunting by IWC nations. In 1994, the IWC reported evidence from genetic testing of whale meat and blubber for sale on the open market in Japan in 1993. In addition to the legally permitted minke whale, the analyses showed that 10–25% of tissues sampled came from non minke, baleen whales, neither of which were then allowed under IWC rules. Further research in 1995 and 1996 showed a significant drop of non-minke baleen whales sampled to 2.5%. In a separate paper, Baker stated that "many of these animals certainly represent a bycatch (incidental entrapment in fishing gear)" and stated that DNA monitoring of whale meat is required to adequately track whale products.

It was revealed in 1994 that the Soviet Union had been systematically undercounting its catch. For example, from 1948 to 1973, the Soviet Union caught 48,477 humpback whales rather than the 2,710 it officially reported to the IWC. On the basis of this new information, the IWC stated that it would have to rewrite its catch figures for the last forty years. According to Ray Gambell, then-Secretary of the IWC, the organization had raised its suspicions with the former Soviet Union, but it did not take further action because it could not interfere with national sovereignty.

Health risks 

Whales are long-lived predators, so their tissues build up concentrations of methyl mercury from their prey. Mercury concentrations reach levels that are hazardous to humans who consume too much too often, since mercury also bioaccumulates in humans. High levels have been found in the Caribbean,
where people are advised not to exceed one serving every three weeks,
in the Faroe Islands,
and in Japan.

Effects of whaling on global carbon cycles 
Scientists have analyzed the ability of the oceans to sequester atmospheric carbon before whaling and in modern times, hundreds of years after the most active whaling periods. Focusing on the amount of carbon stored in baleen whales, scientists determined that large marine mammals hold over 9 million less tons of carbon in the ocean than during the pre whaling era (9.1 x 10^6 tons).  

Whales play an important role in the carbon cycle in life and death. Living whales cycle carbon and nitrogen through throughout the water column via whale feces where it can contribute to primary productivity at the surface. In death, whales can become part of a whale fall and sink to the bottom, bringing their carbon with them to help form a temporary ecosystem at the ocean floor. 

Despite rebounding whale numbers after the international ban on whaling, climate change and rising carbon levels continue to hinder the amount of carbon sequestered by whales.

By country

Australia 

Whaling was a major maritime industry in Australia from 1791 until its final cessation in 1978. At least 45 whaling stations operated in Tasmania during the 19th century, and bay whaling was conducted out of a number of other mainland centres. Modern whaling using harpoon guns and iron hulled catchers was conducted in the twentieth century from shore-based stations in Western Australia, South Australia, New South Wales and Queensland, also in Norfolk Island. Overfishing saw the closure of some whaling stations before a government ban on the industry was introduced in 1978.

Canada 

Canadians kill about 600 narwhals per year. They kill 100 belugas per year in the Beaufort Sea,
300 in northern Quebec (Nunavik),
and an unknown number in Nunavut.
The total annual kill in Beaufort and Quebec areas varies between 300 and 400 belugas per year. Numbers are not available for Nunavut since 2003, when the Arviat area, with about half Nunavut's hunters, killed 200–300 belugas, though the authors say hunters resist giving complete numbers.

Harvested meat is sold through shops and supermarkets in northern communities where whale meat is a component of the traditional diet. Hunters in Hudson's Bay rarely eat beluga meat. They give a little to dogs, and leave the rest for wild animals. Other areas may dry the meat for later consumption by humans. An average of one or two vertebrae and one or two teeth per beluga or narwhal are carved and sold. Hunts receive subsidies, but they continue as a tradition, rather than for the money, and the economic analysis noted that whale watching may be an alternate revenue source.

The Whale and Dolphin Conservation says: "Canada has pursued a policy of marine mammal management which appears to be more to do with political expediency rather than conservation."

Canada left the IWC in 1982, and the only IWC-regulated species currently harvested by the Canadian Inuit is the bowhead whale. As of 2004, the limit on bowhead whale hunting allows for the hunt of one whale every two years from the Hudson Bay-Foxe Basin population, and one whale every 13 years from the Baffin Bay-Davis Strait population. This is roughly one-fiftieth of the bowhead whale harvest limits in Alaska (see below).

Denmark

Faroe Islands 

The Faroe Islands are legally part of the Kingdom of Denmark, but are geographically isolated and culturally distinct. The hunt, known as the Grindadráp, is regulated by Faroese authorities but not by the IWC, which does not claim jurisdiction over small cetaceans.

Around 800 long-finned pilot whales (Globicephala melaena) are caught each year, mainly during the summer. Other species are not hunted, though occasionally Atlantic white-sided dolphin can be found among the pilot whales.

Most Faroese consider the hunt an important part of their culture and history and arguments about the topic raise strong emotions. Animal-rights groups criticize the hunt as being cruel and unnecessary and economically insignificant. Hunters claim that most journalists lack knowledge of the catch methods used to capture and kill the whales.

Greenland 

Greenlandic Inuit whalers catch around 175 large whales per year, mostly minke whales,
as well as 360 narwhals,
200 belugas,
190 pilot whales and 2,300 porpoises.

IWC sets limits for large whales. The government of Greenland sets limits for narwhals and belugas. There are no limits on pilot whales and porpoises.

The IWC treats the west and east coasts of Greenland as two separate population areas and sets separate quotas for each coast. The far more densely populated west coast accounts for over 90 percent of the catch. The average per year from 2012 to 2016 was around 150 minke and 17 fin whales and humpback whales taken from west coast waters and around 10 minke from east coast waters. In April 2009 Greenland landed its first bowhead whale in nearly forty years. It landed three bowheads each year in 2009 and 2010, one each in 2011 and 2015.

In 2021 the Sermersooq municipal council banned whaling in Nuup Kangerlua, one of the largest fjords in inhabited areas of Greenland. The council did not want hunting to kill the humpback whales seen by the local tourism industry. Before local humpback hunting resumed in 2010 there had been nine humpbacks in the fjord during summer. When hunting resumed some were killed and others left.
 Sermersooq has not banned whaling elsewhere in the municipality, which is the world's largest municipality, at 200,000 square miles on both coasts.

The Inuit already caught whales around Greenland since the years 1200–1300. They mastered the art of whaling around the year 1000 in the Bering Strait. The technique consists of spearing a whale with a spear connected to an inflated seal bladder. The bladder would float and exhaust the whale when diving, and when it surfaces; the Inuit hunters would spear it again, further exhausting the animal until they were able to kill it.

Vikings on Greenland also ate whale meat, but archaeologists believe they never hunted them on sea.

Germany 
Originally one of the most successful whaling nations, German whaling vessels started from Hamburg and other, smaller cities on the Elbe River, hunting for whales around Greenland and Spitsbergen. While 1770 is recorded to have been the most successful year of German whaling, German whaling went into steep decline with the beginning of the Napoleonic Wars and never really recovered. After the Napoleonic Wars, Germany tried but could never re-establish a successful whaling industry. German whaling ships in the mid to late 1800s would generally not be staffed with experienced sailors but rather with members of more wealthy farming communities, going for short trips to Scandinavia during the end of spring / beginning of summer, when their labor was not required on the fields. This kind of whaling was ineffective. Many journeys would not lead to any whales caught, instead seal- and polar bear skins were brought back to shore. Communities often paid more for equipping the vessels in the first place than making money with the goods brought back to shore. Today, local historians believe that German whaling in the late 1800s was more a rite of passage for the sons of wealthy farmers from northern German islands than an action undertaken for true commercial reason. German whaling was abandoned in 1872.

Prior to the first world war, the newly established German Empire attempted to re-establish large scale German whaling. This was undertaken with ships either going from Germany to Iceland or from the newly established German colonies to African waters. These attempts never were commercially successful and quickly given up. Only in the 1930s could Germany – with mainly Norwegian personnel – re-establish a large and successful whaling industry. More than 15,000 whales were caught between 1930 and 1939. With the beginning of the second world war, German whaling was abandoned completely.

In the early 1950s, Germany maintained one whaling vessel for testing purpose as it considered re-establishing a German whaling fleet, but abandoned these plans in 1956. The last remaining German whalers worked for Dutch vessels in the 1950s and 1960s.

Iceland 

Iceland is one of a handful of countries that still maintain a whaling fleet. One company concentrates on hunting fin whales, largely for export to Japan, while the only other one hunts minke whales for domestic consumption, as the meat is popular with tourists. Iceland has its own whale watching sector, which exists in uneasy tension with the whaling industry.

Iceland did not object to the 1986 IWC moratorium. Between 1986 and 1989 around 60 animals per year were taken under a scientific permit. However, under strong pressure from anti-whaling countries, who viewed scientific whaling as a circumvention of the moratorium, Iceland ceased whaling in 1989. Following the IWC's 1991 refusal to accept its Scientific Committee's recommendation to allow sustainable commercial whaling, Iceland left the IWC in 1992.

Iceland rejoined the IWC in 2002 with a reservation to the moratorium. Iceland presented a feasibility study to the 2003 IWC meeting for catches in 2003 and 2004. The primary aim of the study was to deepen the understanding of fish–whale interactions. Amid disagreement within the IWC Scientific Committee about the value of the research and its relevance to IWC objectives, no decision on the proposal was reached. However, under the terms of the convention the Icelandic government issued permits for a scientific catch. In 2003 Iceland resumed scientific whaling which continued in 2004 and 2005.

Iceland resumed commercial whaling in 2006. Its annual quota was 30 minke whales (out of an estimated 174,000 animals in the central and north-eastern North Atlantic) and nine fin whales (out of an estimated 30,000 animals in the central and north-eastern North Atlantic). For the 2012 commercial whaling season, starting in April and lasting six months, the quota was set to 216 minke whales, of which 52 were caught.

Iceland did not hunt any whales in 2019 and it is reported that demand for whale meat decreased in that year.

Indonesia 

Lamalera, on the south coast of the island of Lembata, and Lamakera on neighbouring Solor, are the two remaining Indonesian whaling communities. The hunters obey religious taboos that ensure that they use every part of the animal. About half of the catch is kept in the village; the rest is bartered in local markets.

In 1973, the United Nations's Food and Agriculture Organization (FAO) sent a whaling ship and a Norwegian whaler to modernize their hunt. This effort lasted three years, and was not successful. According to the FAO report, the Lamalerans "have evolved a method of whaling which suits their natural resources, cultural tenets and style." Lamalerans say they returned the ship because they immediately caught five sperm whales, too many to butcher and eat without refrigeration. Since these communities only hunt whales for noncommercial purposes, it is categorized as 'aboriginal subsistence hunters' by International Whaling Commission (IWC).

The Lamalerans hunt for several species of whales but catching sperm whales are preferable, while other whales, such as baleen whales, are considered taboo to hunt. They caught five sperm whales in 1973; they averaged about 40 per year from the 1960s through the mid 1990s, 13 total from 2002 to 2006, 39 in 2007, an average of 20 per year 2008 through 2014, and caught 3 in 2015.

Traditional Lamaleran whaling used wooden fishing boats built by a group of local craftsmen clan called ata molã and the fishermen will mourn the "death" of their ships for two months. These days, the Lamalerans use a motor engine to power their boats; however, their tradition dictates that once a whale has been caught, fishermen will have to row their boats and the whale back to the shore. The traditional practices made whaling a dangerous hunt. In one case, a boat was pulled approximately 120 km away towards Timor (see Nantucket sleighride), while in another case, the hunted whale capsized the boat and forced the fishermen to swim for 12 hours back to the shore.

Japan 

When the commercial whaling moratorium was introduced by the IWC in 1982, Japan lodged an official objection. However, in response to US threats to cut Japan's fishing quota in US territorial waters under the terms of the Packwood-Magnuson Amendment, Japan withdrew its objection in 1987. According to the BBC, the US went back on this promise, effectively destroying the deal. Since Japan could not resume commercial whaling, it began whaling on a purported scientific-research basis. Australia, Greenpeace, the Australian Marine Conservation Society, Sea Shepherd Conservation Society and other groups dispute the Japanese claim of research "as a disguise for commercial whaling, which is banned." The Sea Shepherd Conservation Society has attempted to disrupt Japanese whaling in the Antarctic since 2003 but eventually ceased this activity in 2017 due to little achievement in creating change. Other NGOs such as the Australian Marine Conservation Society and Humane Society International continued to campaign against Japan's scientific whaling program and block votes at IWC to bring back commercial whaling.

The stated purpose of the research program is to establish the size and dynamics of whale populations. The Japanese government wishes to resume whaling in a sustainable manner under the oversight of the IWC, both for whale products (meat, etc.) and to help preserve fishing resources by culling whales. Anti-whaling organizations claim that the research program is a front for commercial whaling, that the sample size is needlessly large and that equivalent information can be obtained by non-lethal means, for example by studying samples of whale tissue (such as skin) or feces. The Japanese government sponsored Institute of Cetacean Research (ICR), which conducts the research, disagrees, stating that the information obtainable from tissue and/or feces samples is insufficient and that the sample size is necessary in order to be representative.

Japan's scientific whaling program is controversial in anti-whaling countries. Countries opposed to whaling have passed non-binding resolutions in the IWC urging Japan to stop the program. Japan claims that whale stocks for some species are sufficiently large to sustain commercial hunting and blame filibustering by the anti-whaling side for the continuation of scientific whaling. Deputy whaling commissioner, Joji Morishita, told BBC News:The reason for the moratorium [on commercial whaling] was scientific uncertainty about the number of whales. ... It was a moratorium for the sake of collecting data and that is why we started scientific whaling. We were asked to collect more data.This collusive relationship between the whaling industry and the Japanese government is sometimes criticized by pro-whaling activists who support local, small-scale coastal whaling such as the Taiji dolphin drive hunt.

In September 2018, Japan chaired the 67th IWC meeting in Brazil and attempted to pass a motion to lift the moratorium on commercial whaling. Japan did not receive enough votes and the IWC rejected the motion. Subsequently, on 26 December 2018, Japan announced that it would withdraw its membership from the IWC, because in its opinion, the IWC had failed its duty to promote sustainable hunting as the culture within the IWC moved towards an anti-whaling, pro-conservation agenda. Japanese officials also announced they will resume commercial hunting within its territorial waters and its 200-mile exclusive economic zones starting in July 2019, but it will cease whaling activities in the Antarctic Ocean, the northwest Pacific Ocean, and the Australian Whale Sanctuary.

In 2019, the Australian Marine Conservation Society and International Fund for Animal Welfare commissioned legal opinion, which concluded that Japan's commercial whaling program within its territorial waters breaks international convention and law and that Japan makes itself vulnerable to potential international legal action.

Norway 

Norway registered an objection to the International Whaling Commission moratorium and is thus not bound by it. Commercial whaling ceased for a five-year period to allow a small scientific catch for gauging the stock's sustainability; whaling subsequently resumed in 1993. Minke whales are the only legally hunted species. Catches have fluctuated between 487 animals in 2000 to 592 in 2007. For the year 2011 the quota is set at 1,286 minke whales. The catch is made solely from the Northeast Atlantic minke whale population, which is estimated at 102,000.

Philippines 

Whaling in the Philippines has been illegal since 1997 since the Fisheries Administrative Order 185 of 1991 was amended. The order initially only made illegal the catching, selling, or transporting of dolphins but the 1997 amendment widened the scope of the ban to include all cetaceans including whales. The calls for ban on whaling and dolphin hunting in the Philippines were raised by both domestic and international groups after local whaling and dolphin hunting traditions of residents of Pamilacan in Bohol were featured in newspapers in the 1990s. As compromise for residents of Pamilacan who were dependent on whaling and dolphin hunting, whale and dolphin watching is being promoted in the island as a source of tourism income. Despite the ban, it is believed that the whaling industry in the Philippines did not cease to exist but went underground.

Russia 

Russia had a significant whaling hunt of orcas and dolphins along with Iceland and Japan. The Soviet Union's harvest of over 534,000 whales between the 1930s and the 1980s has been called one of the most senseless environmental crimes of the 20th century. In 1970, a study published by Bigg M.A. following photographic recognition of orcas found a significant difference in the suspected ages of whale populations and their actual ages. Following this evidence, the Soviet Union and then Russia continued a scientific whale hunt, though the verisimilitude of the intentions of the hunt over the last 40 years are questioned.

The Soviet Union's intensive illegal whaling program from 1948 to 1973 was controlled and managed by the central government. In Soviet society, whaling was perceived to be a glamorous and well-paid job. Whalers were esteemed as well-traveled adventurers, and their return to land was often celebrated elaborately such as with fanfare and parades. In regard to economics, the Soviet Union transformed from a "rural economy into an industrial giant" by disregarding the sustainability of a resource to fill high production targets. The government had controlled all industries, including fisheries, and whaling was not constrained by the need for sustainability through profits. Managers' and workers' production was incentivized with salary bonuses of 25%-60% and various other benefits, awards, and privileges. Many industries, whaling included, became a "manic numbers game".

Currently, the indigenous Chukchi people in Chukotka Autonomous Okrug in the Russian Far East are permitted under IWC regulation to take up to 140 gray whales from the North-East Pacific population each year. About 40 beluga whales are caught in the Sea of Okhotsk each year.
There are no recent data on catches in the Arctic Ocean or Bering Sea, where about 60 belugas per year were caught in the early 1980s.

Saint Vincent and the Grenadines 

Natives of Saint Vincent and the Grenadines on the island of Bequia have a quota from the International Whaling Commission of up to four humpback whales per year.
Their quota allows up to four humpback whales per year using only traditional hunting methods of hand-thrown harpoons in small, open sailboats. The limit is rarely met, with no catch some years.
Its classification as aboriginal, and therefore permissible, is highly contested. In the 2012 meeting of the IWC, delegates from several anti-whaling countries, and environmental groups, spoke out against it, calling it "artisanal whaling out of control".

The meat is sold commercially and 82% of Bequia residents consume it at least occasionally, though it is subject to high levels of methyl mercury.

Residents of the town of Barrouallie hunt and sell meat from short-finned pilot whales and several dolphin species, including killer whales and false killer whales. 92% of people from the town, and high fractions from nearby towns, eat this meat at least occasionally. Sellers call this meat "black fish" without regard to species. Its levels of methyl mercury mean that consumption needs to be less than a serving every three weeks. However the mercury danger is not well known in the country. As of 2020 the government is considering banning the hunt of killer whales.

South Korea 
In early July 2012, during IWC discussions in Panama, South Korea said it would undertake scientific whaling as allowed despite the global moratorium on whaling. South Korea's envoy to the summit, Kang Joon-Suk, said that consumption of whale meat "dates back to historical times" and that there had been an increase in the minke whale population since the ban took place in 1986. "Legal whaling has been strictly banned and subject to strong punishments, though the 26 years have been painful and frustrating for the people who have been traditionally taking whales for food." He said that South Korea would undertake whaling in its own waters. New Zealand's Commissioner Gerard van Bohemen accused South Korea of putting the whale population at risk. He also cited Japan as having not contributed to science for several years despite undertaking scientific whaling. New Zealand's stated position may be seen by its media as less solid than Australia's on the matter given that its indigenous people are pushing forward with plans, unopposed by the government, to recommence whaling there. The people of Ulsan have also traditionally and contemporarily eaten whale meat. South Korea's representative at the IWC said that "this is not a forum for moral debate. This is a forum for legal debate. As a responsible member of the commission we do not accept any such categorical, absolute proposition that whales should not be killed or caught."

The sale and purchase of whale meat is allowed if an official certificate is issued for bycatch, where whales die when they are caught in nets used to catch other fish. Bycatch of whales and dolphines reached 2,751 in 2012 and 1,849 in 2014. Ulsan Environmental Education Institute director Oh Yeong-ae argued "The policy of allowing sale of whales caught incidentally may be encouraging illegal whaling".

United States 

In the United States, beluga whaling is widely carried out, catching about 300 belugas per year,
monitored by the Alaska Beluga Whale Committee. The annual catch ranges between 250 and 600 per year.

Subsistence hunting of the bowhead whale is carried out by nine different indigenous Alaskan communities, and is managed by the Alaska Eskimo Whaling Commission which reports to the National Oceanic and Atmospheric Administration. The hunt takes around 50 bowhead whales a year from a population of about 10,500 in Alaskan waters. Conservationists fear this hunt is not sustainable, though the IWC Scientific Committee, the same group that provided the above population estimate, projects a population growth of 3.2% per year. Bowhead whales weigh approximately 5–10 times as much as minke whales. The hunt also took an average of one or two gray whales each year until 1996. The quota was reduced to zero in that year due to sustainability concerns. A future review may result in the gray whale hunt being resumed. 

The Makah tribe in Washington state also reinstated whaling in 1999, despite protests from animal rights groups. They are currently seeking to resume whaling of the gray whale, a right recognized in the Treaty of Neah Bay, within limits (Article 4 of the Treaty).

See also 
 Harpoon
 Flensing, processing of caught whales
 Sperm whaling
 Dolphin drive hunting

References

Further reading 
 Jakobina Arch, Bringing Whales Ashore: Oceans and the Environment of Early Modern Japan. Weyerhaeuser Environmental Books. (Seattle:  University of Washington Press, 2018)
 D. Graham Burnett, The Sounding of the Whale (Chicago: The University of Chicago Press, 2013)
 Mark Cioc, The Game of Conservation: International Treaties to Protect the World's Migratory Species (Athens, Ohio: Ohio University Press, 2009), Chapter 3 The Antarctic Whale Massacre, pp. 104–147
 Kurkpatrick Dorsey, "National Sovereignty, the International Whaling Commission, and the Save the Whales Movement," in Nation-States and the Global Environment. New Approaches to International Environmental History, Erika Marie Bsumek, David Kinkela and Mark Atwood Lawrence, eds., (Oxford: Oxford University Press, 2013), pp. 43–61
 Kurkpatrick Dorsey, Whales and Nations: Environmental Diplomacy on the High Seas (Seattle: University of Washington Press, 2014)
 Charlotte Epstein, The Power of Words in International Relations: Birth of an Anti-Whaling Discourse (Cambridge, MA: MIT Press, 2005)
 Anna-Katharina Wöbse, Weltnaturschutz: Umweltdiplomatie in Völkerbund und Vereinten Nationen, 1920–1950 (Frankfurt: Campus, 2011), Chapter 6 Der Reichtum der Meere, pp. 171–245
 Frank Zelko, Make It a Green Peace!: The Rise of Countercultural Environmentalism (Oxford: Oxford University Press, 2013), Chapters 7–9, pp. 161–231
 Lyubomir Ivanov and Nusha Ivanova. Whaling period. In: The World of Antarctica. Generis Publishing, 2022. pp. 91-94.

External links 

 Digital version of The Grand Panorama of a Whaling Voyage 'Round the World -The history and narratives of Purrington and Russell's Grand Panorama.
 Into the Deep: America, Whaling & the World  — An American Experience Documentary
 "Old Whaling Days", Popular Mechanics, November 1930
 "The Cruise of the Cachalot" by Frank T. Bullen is a book published in 1899 which gives a good background to whaling of the times. 
 On the Water: Fishing for a Living – Online museum exhibition on maritime history from the Smithsonian's National Museum of American History
 Whaling  – Australian Marine Conservation Society Whaling
 Whaling depicted in ship logbooks' art

 
Marine occupations
Whales and humans